Koi Ikeno (池野 恋) is a manga author and illustrator. She was born April 16, 1959, in Hanamaki, Iwate Prefecture, Japan.

She created Tokimeki Tonight in the 1980s and Nurse Angel Ririka in the 1990s, two manga series which received anime adaptations that ran while the manga was ongoing.

Work
Her works include:
1980: Chotto Otogibanashi
1981: Mechanko Kyōshitsu
1982-94: Tokimeki Tonight
1991: Heroine ni Naritai
1995-96: Nurse Angel Ririka SOS
1996-98: Oshiete Nanoka
1998-99: Usotsuki na Season
2001: Misty Boy
2002-09: Tokimeki Midnight

External links

References

1959 births
Japanese female comics artists
Female comics writers
Living people
Women manga artists
People from Hanamaki, Iwate
Manga artists from Iwate Prefecture
Japanese women writers
Japanese women illustrators